Jason Palmer may refer to:

 Jason Palmer (prison officer) (c. 1977–2010), United States-born prison guard in New Zealand
 Jason Palmer (golfer) (born 1984), English golfer